The SoCal Lashings are an American professional Twenty20 franchise cricket team that compete in Minor League Cricket (MiLC). The team is based in Van Nuys, Los Angeles. It was formed in 2020 as part of 24 original teams to compete in Minor League Cricket. The franchise is co-owned by Abhimanyu Rajp and Deepak Gosain.

The team's home ground is the Leo Magnus Cricket Complex, located in the neighborhood of Van Nuys, Los Angeles. Dale Phillips currently helms responsibility as captain, with Elmore Hutchinson standing by as vice-captain.

Franchise history

Background 
Talks of an American Twenty20 league started in November 2018 just before USA Cricket became the new governing body of cricket in the United States. In May 2021, USA Cricket announced they had accepted a bid by American Cricket Enterprises (ACE) for a US$1 billion investment covering the league and other investments benefitting the U.S. national teams.

In an Annual General Meeting on February 21, 2020, it was announced that USA Cricket was planning to launch Major League Cricket in 2021 and Minor League Cricket that summer, but it was delayed due to the COVID-19 pandemic and due to the lack of high-quality cricket stadiums in the USA. Major League Cricket was pushed to a summer-2023 launch and Minor League Cricket was pushed back to July 31, 2021.

USA Cricket CEO Iain Higgins also pointed out cities such as New York City, Houston and Los Angeles with a large cricket fanbase, and targeted them among others as launch cities for Minor League Cricket.

Exhibition league 
In July 2020, the player registration for the Minor League Cricket exhibition league began. On August 15, 2020, USA Cricket announced the teams participating in the exhibition league matches, also listing the owners for each team. The draft for the exhibition league began on August 22, 2020, with the SoCal Lashings releasing their squad on August 24. Abhimanyu Rajp was later named as captain for the SoCal Lashings for the exhibition league.

2021 season 

After the conclusion of the exhibition league, USA Cricket announced that they were planning to launch the inaugural season of Minor League Cricket in spring 2021. Ahead of the official season, which was announced to kick off on July 31, the Lashings announced Abhimanyu Rajp to continue his role as captain with Elmore Hutchinson helming vice-captain duties.

In their first match of the season, the Lashings defeated the Surf Riders by 4 wickets in a last-over thriller. They then went on to lose to the Blazers and to the Grizzlies, but came back to win against the Strikers by 4 wickets the following week. They then went on a 8-game losing streak, losing to the Strikers, the Grizzlies, the Blazers, the Thunderbolts twice, the Athletics, the Mustangs, and the Hurricanes before winning against the Surf Riders and the Master Blasters to end out the group stage. The Lashings finished out in 5th place, thus failing to qualify for the play-offs.

2022 season 
Ahead of the 2022 season, Major League Cricket announced that the draft for that season would take place on May 12.

Current squad 
 Players with international caps are listed in bold.
  denotes a player who is currently unavailable for selection.
  denotes a player who is unavailable for rest of the season

Statistics

Most runs 

Source: CricClubs, Last updated: 3 March 2023

Most wickets 

Source: CricClubs, Last updated: 3 March 2023

See also 
 2022 Minor League Cricket season
 2021 Minor League Cricket season
 2021 Minor League Cricket season squads
 2021 Minor League Cricket season final
 Minor League Cricket
 Major League Cricket 
 Houston Hurricanes (cricket)
 Seattle Thunderbolts
 Silicon Valley Strikers
 DC Hawks

References 

Minor League Cricket teams
Cricket clubs established in 2020
2020 establishments in California